Paty Ripple Kyndiah (7 May 1928 – 26 March 2015) was an Indian politician and a member of the Indian National Congress (INC) political party. He was a member of the 12th Lok Sabha 13th Lok Sabha & 14th Lok Sabha of India. He represented the Shillong constituency in Meghalaya state.
 
Kyndiah was a member of the Meghalaya Legislative Assembly from 1970 to 1993, and he was a Cabinet Minister in the Government of Meghalaya four times between 1975 and 1988. From 1979 to 1981, he was the Leader of the Opposition in the Meghalaya Legislative Assembly; he was Acting Chief Minister of Meghalaya in 1987, and he was Speaker of the Meghalaya Legislative Assembly from 1989 to 1993.

From 10 February 1993 to 28 January 1998 Kyndiah was the Governor of Mizoram. He was elected to the 12th Lok Sabha in 1998. He was re-elected to the 13th Lok Sabha in 1999 and the 14th Lok Sabha in 2004. He became Minister of Tribal Affairs and Development of North Eastern Region (DoNER)on 23 May 2004.

References

1928 births
2015 deaths
Meghalaya politicians
Indian National Congress politicians
India MPs 2004–2009
Members of the Cabinet of India
India MPs 1998–1999
India MPs 1999–2004
Governors of Mizoram
Speakers of the Meghalaya Legislative Assembly
Leaders of the Opposition in Meghalaya
Ministers of Tribal Affairs (India)
Lok Sabha members from Meghalaya